Libuše is a "festival opera" in three acts, with music by Bedřich Smetana. In Czech historical myth, Libuše, the title character, prophesied the founding of Prague. The opera was composed in 1871–72 for the coronation of Franz Josef as King of Bohemia. This did not happen and Smetana saved Libuše for the opening of the National Theatre in Prague, which took place nine years later on 11 June 1881. After the destruction of the National Theatre in a fire, the same opera opened the reconstructed theatre in 1883. The first US performance was reported to have occurred March 1986, in a concert version at Carnegie Hall with Eve Queler and the Opera Orchestra of New York. In the UK, it was first staged by University College Opera in 2019.

Commentators have noted the pageant-like nature of the opera and the influence of Richard Wagner in the music.

Roles

Synopsis

Act 1
The brothers Chrudoš and Sťáhlav are fighting over the settlement of their father's estate, with Queen Libuše as arbiter.  Czech law dictates either co-management or equal division of the land.  German law, which Chrudoš, the elder, favours, would demand primogeniture, where the elder sibling would inherit the entire property.  Libuše decides in favour of equal division, to the anger of Chrudoš, who leaves.  Because some of her male subjects, including Chrudoš, do not fully accept the idea of a woman as their ruler, Libuše then asks her subjects to choose her husband.  They say that she should make her own decision on her spouse, where it turns out that she prefers the farmer Přemysl.  The act ends as the subjects worry about Chrudoš and the possibility that he will sow discord.

Act 2
Scene 1

Part of the reason for Chrudoš' ill humour is revealed, in the relationship of Chrudoš to Krasava.  Chrudoš loves Krasava, who returns his sentiments, but considers him insufficiently romantic in his personality.  Krasava thus feigns romantic interest in Sťáhlav to make Chrudoš jealous.  Her father, Lutobor, asserts his authority and demands that she reconcile the quarreling brothers.  Krasava then challenges Chrudoš to either (a) forgive and embrace her, or (b) kill her with his sword.  Chrudoš takes the route of forgiveness, and reconciles with Sťáhlav.

Scene 2

Přemysl is watching over the harvest on his lands.  A royal escort then arrives to bring him to Queen Libuše, to be married.

Act 3
A celebration of the double wedding, of Libuše to Přemysl, and of Krasava to Chrudoš, is taking place.  Přemysl devises a way for Chrudoš to apologize to the queen while still saving face.  A moment of prophecy then takes hold of Queen Libuše, and she tells of future visions for the Czech nation.

Orchestration 
Piccolo, two flutes, two oboes, two clarinets, two bassoons, four horns, four trumpets, three trombones, tuba, timpani, triangle, cymbals, bass drum, harp, strings. Onstage trumpets.

Recordings
1949, Alois Klíma (conductor), Symphony Orchestra and Chorus of the Prague Radio; Marie Podvalová, Theodor Šrubař, Karel Kalaš, Beno Blachut, Jaroslav Veverka, Bořek Rujan, Ludmila Červinková, Marta Krásová, Miluše Dvořáková, Miloslava Fidlerová, Věra Krilová, Jaroslav Gleich
 1966, Jaroslav Krombholc (conductor), Prague National Theatre Orchestra and Chorus; Naděžda Kniplová, Vacláv Bednár, Věra Soukupová
1983, Zdeněk Košler (conductor), Prague National Theatre Orchestra and Chorus;  Gabriela Beňačková-Čápová, Václav Zítek, Antonín Švorc, Leo Marian Vodička, Eva Děpoltová
1995, Oliver Dohnányi (conductor), Prague National Theatre Orchestra and Chorus; Eva Urbanová, Vratislav Kříž, Luděk Vele, Miloslav Podskalský, Miroslava Volková, Marie Veselá, Jan Markvart, Miroslav Švejda, Pavel Červinka, Jana Jonášová, Jitka Soběhartová, Helena Kaupová

References
Notes

Sources
Warrack, John and West, Ewan, The Oxford Dictionary of Opera New York: OUP: 1992

External links

Operas by Bedřich Smetana
Czech-language operas
1881 operas
Operas
Operas set in Bohemia